Nijat Mehbaliyev (born on 11 September 2000 in Azerbaijan) is an Azerbaijani football goalkeeper who plays for Sabah in the Azerbaijan Premier League.

Career

Club
On 17 April 2021, Mehbaliyev made his debut in the Azerbaijan Premier League for Sabah match against Shamakhi.

References

External links
 

2000 births
Living people
Association football goalkeepers
Azerbaijani footballers
Azerbaijan Premier League players
Gabala FC players 
Sabah FC (Azerbaijan) players